Groupe Sporting Club Marseillais, known as GSC Marseille was a French football club which competed in Division 2 in the 1949–50 season, as well as the Coupe de France.

References

Association football clubs established in 1949
1949 establishments in France
Association football clubs disestablished in 1951
1951 disestablishments in France
Football clubs in Marseille
Defunct football clubs in France